Nā Palapalai is a Hawaiian music band, originally founded in Hilo, Hawaii. Founded by Kuana Torres Kahele, Kapulanakehau "Kehau" Tamure, and Keao Costa. The group arranges traditional and contemporary Hawaiian music, performing and recording with instruments such as ukulele, guitar, ipu, and upright bass. The majority of the lyrics are written and performed in the Hawaiian language. The group has released a total of eight albums each earning multiple Na Hoku Hanohano Awards, including Group of the Year. Several have charted in the top five on the Billboard Top World Albums chart,

History 
In 1995, at 17, Kuana and fellow Hilo native and falsetto musician, Kehau Tamure, emerged as one of the most popular Hawaiian Music groups to date, Na Palapalai. They were raised on traditional music and laid the foundation for what has come to be known as their distinctive Na Palapalai sound.

In 2002, they released “Makani ‘Olu’olu” to meteoric success and raves from the critics. Kuana's original, “Ke Anu O Waimea” is still the most popular hula song in Japan to this day. Na Palapalai has continued to maintain its popularity 20 years later and has released seven albums to date.

Hoʻopili Hou 
After a lengthy hiatus, Na Palapalai returned to the stage with all three original members (Kuana Torres Kahele, Kehau Tamure, and Keao Costa) The album was recorded live at the Historic Hawai’i Theatre during Kuana's 2017 Winter Wonderland concert.

Discography 
 1999: Kaona
 2002: Makani ʻOluʻolu
 2004: Ke ʻAla Beauty
 2006: Ka Pua Hae Hawaiʻi
 2009: Nānea
 2010: The Best of Na Palapalai
 2012: Haʻa
 2018: Hoʻopili Hou (live)

 Music Awards 
 Nā Hōkū Hanohano Awards 
The Na Hoku Hanohano Awards, occasionally called the "Hoku Awards", are the premier music awards in Hawaiʻi and are Hawaiʻi's equivalent to the Grammy Awards. The awards are presented to the musicians exemplifying the best work in their class. Nominated 17 times and winner of 7 Na Hoku Hanohano Awards including “Hawaiian Album of the Year,” “Group of the Year,” and “Hawaiian Language,” Na Palapalai is on the playlist of everyone that loves Hawaiian/World music in the islands and abroad. A favorite of Hula dancers, Na Palapalai is internationally recognized for its highly spirited Hawaiian music. 
 2000: Kaona'' - Group of the Year

See also 
 Music of Hawaii
 Kuana Torres Kahele

References

External links 
 Kuana Torres Kahele at the Mountain Apple Company
 NaPalapalaiMusic.com

Native Hawaiian musicians
Musical groups from Hawaii
Mountain Apple Company artists